Michal Novák (born May 18, 1982) is a Slovak ice hockey defenceman playing for the HC Košice in the Slovak Extraliga.

External links

1982 births
Living people
Sportspeople from Skalica
Slovak ice hockey defencemen
HC Košice players
Slovak expatriate ice hockey players in Canada
Slovak expatriate ice hockey players in Sweden